Heinz Weber (born 5 December 1976) is an Austrian former professional footballer who played as a goalkeeper.

References

1976 births
Living people
Austrian footballers
Association football goalkeepers
Austrian Football Bundesliga players
2. Liga (Austria) players
2. Bundesliga players
First Vienna FC players
FC Tirol Innsbruck players
FC St. Pauli players
SK Sturm Graz players
Kremser SC players
FC Gratkorn players
SK Austria Kärnten players
SK Austria Klagenfurt players
Austrian expatriate footballers
Austrian expatriate sportspeople in Germany
Expatriate footballers in Germany
Footballers from Vienna